Emre Nedzhmettinovych Manuila (born 20 September 2004) is a Ukrainian professional footballer who plays as a right back.

References

External links
 Profile on Bukovyna Chernivtsi official website
 
 

2004 births
Living people
Footballers from Istanbul
Ukrainian people of Turkish descent
Ukrainian footballers
Association football defenders
FC Bukovyna Chernivtsi players
Ukrainian Second League players